Disorderlies is a 1987 screwball comedy feature film starring the rap group, The Fat Boys, and Ralph Bellamy. The film was directed by Michael Schultz who previously directed The Fat Boys in Krush Groove.

Plot summary
Winslow Lowry is a no-good, indebted gambler and the nephew of elderly, infirm millionaire Albert Dennison. Winslow seeks to speed up his uncle's demise by hiring three of the most inept orderlies he can possibly find. The trio (played by The Fat Boys Markie, Buffy and Kool) only mean well, however, and their good-natured antics actually help re-energize the ailing Albert. In the end the trio and Albert learn about Winslow's scheme and try to stop him.

Cast
 Mark Morales as Markie
 Darren Robinson as Buffy
 Damon Wimbley as Kool
 Ralph Bellamy as Albert Dennison
 Tony Plana as Miguel
 Anthony Geary as Winslow Lowry
 Marco Rodríguez as Luis Montana
 Troy Beyer as Carla
 Garth Wilton as George the Butler
 Helen Reddy as Happy Socialite
 Sam Chew Jr. as the Doctor
 Ray Parker Jr. as the Pizza Deliveryman
 Robert V. Barron as the Funeral Home Director
 Jo Marie Payton as Kool's Mother
 Don Hood as Sgt. Bledsoe
 Rick Zumwalt as Florida Lie Detector
 Rick Nielsen as Hijacked Car Driver

Commercial performance
The film made more than $10 million at the box office.

Soundtrack
In addition to the score co-composed by Anne Dudley from the Art of Noise, the soundtrack features The Fat Boys performing a cover version of The Beatles' "Baby, You're a Rich Man", as well as other rap, pop and rock tracks. The soundtrack CD was last issued in 1995 and has since gone out of print.

Track listing
 "Baby, You're a Rich Man" – The Fat Boys
 "I Heard a Rumour" – Bananarama
 "Disorderly Conduct" – Latin Rascals
 "Big Money" – Ca$hflow
 "Don't Treat Me Like This" – Anita
 "Edge of a Broken Heart" – Bon Jovi
 "Trying to Dance" – Tom Kimmel
 "Roller One" – Art of Noise
 "Fat Off My Back" – Gwen Guthrie
 "Work Me Down" – Laura Hunter

References

External links
 
 
 

1987 films
1987 comedy films
1980s English-language films
Films about old age
Films directed by Michael Schultz
Films set in Florida
Films set in hospitals
Warner Bros. films
Films scored by Anne Dudley
African-American comedy films
1980s American films